A pika is a small mammal of the genus Ochotona.

Pika may also refer to:

People
 Heliodor Píka (1897–1949), Czechoslovak army officer
 Pika Danylo (1901–1941), Ukrainian bandura player
 Hikaru Minegishi (born 1991), nicknamed Pika, Filipino footballer

Vehicles
 GAF Pika, manually-operated prototype of the GAF Jindivik, a target drone of Australia
 Isuzu Pika, a Japanese light truck
 JMC Pika, a midsized pickup truck for the Chinese market

Places 
Pika Lake, a body of water of the Pika River in Lac-Achouakan, QuebeC, Canada
Pika River, a tributary of the Pikauba River, flowing in Saguenay–Lac-Saint-Jean, Quebec, Canada
 Pika Peak, a mountain in Banff National Park in Alberta, Canada

Other uses
 Pika (subgenus), a subgenus of the genus Ochotona, aka the Pika Pika
 Pikachu, a Pokémon who speaks only one word, pikachu, frequently clipped to pika and as a doublet pikapika
 Pika Édition, a manga publisher from France
 PIKA Industrial Woodworking School, Semarang, Indonesia
 TV Pika, a Slovenian TV show

See also
 Pika pika (disambiguation)
 Pica (disambiguation)
 PICA (disambiguation)
 Pico (disambiguation)
 Piko (disambiguation)